Applied Biomathematics is a private research and software firm in
East Setauket, New York, that conducts scientific research and develops scientific and statistical software for research and education.
The corporate offices are located in a historical district on Long Island, in the oldest settlement in Brookhaven Town, about one mile from Stony Brook University.

Applied Biomathematics translates theoretical concepts from biology and the physical sciences into mathematical and statistical methods to quantitatively solve practical environmental, health, and engineering problems. The company disseminates its methodological developments via its RAMAS software products for use in conservation biology, resource management, healthcare, ecology, and various engineering disciplines such as risk analysis,
uncertainty quantification, reliability assessments, viability analysis, and survival analysis.
The methods and RAMAS brand software products
developed by AB are used by hundreds of academic institutions around the world, government agencies, and industrial and private labs.

Applied Biomathematics is funded primarily by research grants and contracts from the U.S. government and private industry associations.
The company has received several grants from the Small Business Innovation Research program, including awards from the National Institutes of Health, United States Department of Agriculture, NASA, National Science Foundation, and the Nuclear Regulatory Commission.
Other project funding has come from the Electric Power Research Institute and individual utility companies, healthcare, pharmaceutical and seed companies such as Pfizer, DuPont and Dow. The company has provided risk analysis specifics to the U.S. Army Corps of Engineers.
About 10% of its revenues come from software sales and licensing.

Applied Biomathematics conducts research in four main areas: environment, engineering, human health, and data science. Research pertaining to environmental issues includes assessments in conservation biology, ecology, pest management, and ecotoxicology. In engineering, research focuses on risk analysis, probability bounds analysis, and uncertainty projection. Research in human health addresses analytical needs in human health research and risk analysis, including statistical methods for detecting disease clusters and the anonymization of patient data. The company's data science unit, Dubito Analytics, provides high quality analysis of large, complex datasets. Methods developed through Applied Biomathematics' research are packaged in RAMAS software tools, tailored to meet the needs of scientists, engineers, educators, and students.

Applied Biomathematics is a registered service mark and RAMAS is a registered trademark of Applied Biomathematics, Inc.

References

External links
 Official website
 Applied Biomathematics Uncertainty blog

Companies based in Suffolk County, New York
Science and technology think tanks
Population research organizations
Think tanks based in the United States